Volodymyr Ponomarenko (born 29 October 1972 in Mykolaiv, in the Ukrainian SSR of the Soviet Union - in present-day Ukraine) is a former Ukrainian football midfielder, and currently the coach of MFC Mykolaiv-2 in the Ukrainian Second League.

Ponomarenko is the product of Mykolaiv's youth sportive school system. His first trainer was Viktor Shekhovtsev.

On 3 November 2013 he became the interim coach of MFC Mykolaiv in the Ukrainian First League. From 11 March 2014 he continues as assistant coach in the same club.

References

External links

1972 births
Living people
Ukrainian footballers
Soviet footballers
Ukrainian football managers
FC Artania Ochakiv players
FC Kryvbas-2 Kryvyi Rih players
MFC Mykolaiv players
FC Kryvbas Kryvyi Rih players
FC Metalurh Donetsk players
FC Metalurh-2 Donetsk players
SC Tavriya Simferopol players
MFC Mykolaiv managers
Sportspeople from Mykolaiv

Association football midfielders